List of speakers of the Parliament of South Ossetia.

Below is a list of office-holders:

See also
Heads of State of South Ossetia

External links 
 «Гассиев Знаур Николаевич — Председатель Парламента РЮО IV созыва»
 «Кочиев Станислав Яковлевич — Председатель Парламента РЮО V созыва»
 Компартия возмущена смещением с должности спикера парламента Южной Осетии

Politics of South Ossetia
South Ossetia
South Ossetia, Parliament